Stanislas Champein (19 November 1753 – 19 September 1830) was an 18th/19th-century French composer and politician, a member of the Institut de France.

In 1792, Champein joined the administration and was made a Prefect in Mainz.

Works (selection) 
He is known for several witty musical scores which were long part of the repertoire including:
1787: Les Dettes
1779: Le Soldat français, opéra comique
1781: La Mélomanie, parody of Italian music
1789: Le Nouveau Don Quixote which the author passed of as an Italian opera
1807: Laurette, one-act opera, libretto by Joseph Pain

External links 
 Stanislas Champein on Data.bnf.fr
 Ses œuvres et leurs représentations (1779-1794) sur le site CÉSAR

18th-century classical composers
French Classical-period composers
French opera composers
Male opera composers
Musicians from Marseille
1753 births
1830 deaths
18th-century French composers
18th-century French male musicians
19th-century French male musicians
French male classical composers
Politicians from Marseille